Kenneth Carlyle "Gerry" Gerard (July 14, 1903 – January 17, 1951) was an American basketball and soccer coach. He served as the head basketball coach at Duke University from 1943 to 1950, compiling a record of 131–78. Gerard first arrived at Duke to serve as the director of intramural sports in 1931. He helped form the Duke Blue Devils men's soccer program in 1935, coaching the team for 11 seasons.

A native of Mishawaka, Indiana, Gerard attended the University of Illinois, where played basketball and football as an end and quarterback. He also threw the javelin on Illinois track team. He graduated from Illinois in June 1928 with a Bachelor of Science degree and began his career that fall as a teacher and head football coach at the high school in Athens, Pennsylvania.

Gerard joined the Duke basketball coaching staff in 1941, acting as an assistant coach under Eddie Cameron for two seasons, prior to being named head coach in 1943. He coached Duke for eight seasons (1943–1950), winning the Southern Conference tournament and Coach of the Year honors in 1944 and 1946.

Gerard's health began to decline in 1949 and he took a leave of absence in November 1950. He died on January 17, 1951, at Duke University Hospital, in Durham, North Carolina after a serious injury lasting several months.

Head coaching record

Basketball

References

External links
 Gerry Gerard at Sports-Reference.com
 K.C. "Gerry" Gerard at goduke.com
 

1903 births
1951 deaths
American football ends
American football quarterbacks
American male javelin throwers
Duke Blue Devils men's basketball coaches
Duke Blue Devils men's soccer coaches
Illinois Fighting Illini football players
Illinois Fighting Illini men's basketball players
Illinois Fighting Illini men's track and field athletes
High school football coaches in Pennsylvania
Schoolteachers from Pennsylvania
People from Mishawaka, Indiana
Coaches of American football from Indiana
Players of American football from Indiana
Basketball coaches from Indiana
Basketball players from Indiana
Soccer coaches from Indiana
Track and field athletes from Indiana